Sedulius (sometimes with the nomen Coelius or Caelius, both of doubtful authenticity) was a Christian poet of the first half of the 5th century.

Biography
Extremely little is known about his life. Sedulius is the Latin form of the Irish name Siadhal. The only trustworthy information is given by his two letters to Macedonius, from which we learn that he devoted his early life, perhaps as a teacher of rhetoric, to secular literature. Late in life he converted to Christianity, or, if a Christian before, began to take his faith more seriously. One medieval commentary states that he resided in Italy.  He is termed a presbyter by Isidore of Seville and in the Gelasian decree.

Works
His fame rests mainly upon a long poem, Carmen paschale, based on the four gospels. In style a bombastic imitator of Virgil, he shows, nevertheless, a certain freedom in the handling of the Biblical story, and the poem soon became a quarry for the minor poets.

His other writings include an Abecedarian hymn in honour of Christ, A solis ortus cardine, consisting of twenty-three quatrains of iambic dimeters. This poem has partly passed into the liturgy, the first seven quatrains forming the Christmas hymn "A solis ortus cardine"; and the Epiphany hymn, "Hostis Herodes impie." A "Veteris et novi Testamenti collatio" in elegiac couplets has also come down.

Editions
Faustino Arévalo (Rome, 1794), reprinted in Jacques Paul Migne's Patrologia Latina vol. xix.
Johann Huemer (Vienna, 1885).
Victoria Panagl (Bearb.), Sedulius, Opera Omnia, Ex Recensione Iohannis Huemer (Corpus Scriptorum Ecclesiasticorum Latinorum, 10), Wien, 2007, XLVII, 532 S.

References

Sources
 This work in turn cites:
Johann Huemer, De Sedulii poetae vita et scriptis commentatio (Vienna, 1878)
Max Manitius, Geschichte der christlich-lateinischen Poesie (Stuttgart, 1891)
Teuffel-Schwabe, History of Roman Literature (Eng. trans.), 473
Herzog-Hauck, Realencyklopädie für protestantische Theologie, xviii. (Leipzig, 1906)
Smith and Wace, Dictionary of Christian Biography (1887)

Further reading
Roger P H Green, Latin Epics of the New Testament: Juvencus, Sedulius, Arator, Oxford UP 2008  (reviewed by Teresa Morgan in the article "Poets for Jesus", Times Literary Supplement 4 April 2008 p 31).

External links 

Biography of Sedulius (5th century poet) at Christian Classics Ethereal Library
Opera Omnia by Migne Patrologia Latina
Book One of Carmen Paschale in English translation, by Patrick McBrine
Latin text of Sedulius at the Latin Library

5th-century Christians
5th-century Romans
5th-century Roman poets
5th-century deaths
Christian poets
5th-century Latin writers
Year of birth unknown
Sedulius